The Inner Rocks comprise a group of three steep rocky unpopulated islets located close to the south-western coast of Tasmania, Australia. Situated adjacent to the Southern Ocean, the  islets are part of the Southwest National Park and the Tasmanian Wilderness World Heritage Site.

Flora and fauna
The vegetation is dominated by ferns and the succulent plant pig face.  Recorded breeding seabird species are the fairy prion (102 pairs) and common diving-petrel (100 pairs).  The metallic skink is present.

See also

 List of islands of Tasmania

References

Islands of South West Tasmania
Protected areas of Tasmania
Important Bird Areas of Tasmania